R Lingaraju (born 27 October 1973), known by his screen name Bala Rajwadi, is an Indian film and stage actor, director known for his work in Kannada cinema predominantly. Portraying mostly negative-shaded characters, he has appeared in over 90 films. Prior to acting in films, he worked as a stage actor with the theatre group called Janamana, from 1993. He has directed various documentaries and stage plays. He made his debut in the 1997 Kannada movie Nodu Baa Nammoora. Since 2016 he has been actively working in the south film industry.

Rajwadi got his major break in films after appearing as an antagonist in Bhairava Geetha (2018) which was a Ram Gopal Varma production. He is also noted for his performances in films like Mufti (2017),  Bharate .
Panchatantra. Damayanthi.
He is the founder of the Niranthara foundation (established in the year 1999), a theatre group which aims to use theatre to address various social issues.

Early life and career

Bala Rajwadi was born as R Lingaraju on 27 October 1973, to S. Racha Shetty and S.Rajamma, in Mysuru of the erstwhile Mysore State (now Karnataka).

Filmography

  Nodu Baa Nammoora (1997)
 Suli (2016)
 Palllata (2016)
 Vardhan (2017)
  Mass Leader (2017)
 Kataka (2017)
 Kariya 2 (2017)
 Once More Kaurava (2017) 
 Nanna Magale Heroine  (2017)
 Mufti (2017)
 Samhaara (2018)
 Idam Premam Jeevanam (2018)
 Dhwaja (2018)
 Bhairava Geetha (2018) (Telugu and Kannada) 
 Vajra (2018)
 My Story  (2018) (Malayalam)
 Fortuner (2019)
 Ravi History (2019)
 Prayanikara Gamanakke (2019)
 Panchatantra (2019)
 Anushka (2019)
 Haftha (2019)
 Bharaate (2019)
 Kademane (Yet to release)
 Damayanthi (2019) 
 Geetha (2019)
 Baddi Magan Lifu (2019)
 Navarathna (2019)
 Siri Lambodara Vivaha (2022)
 Yellow Gangs (2022)

References

External links

Male actors in Kannada cinema
Indian male film actors
People from Mysore district
Living people
1973 births
20th-century Indian male actors
21st-century Indian male actors
Kannada comedians
Indian male comedians
Male actors from Karnataka